The seventh season of the Case Closed anime was directed by Yasuichiro Yamamoto and produced by TMS Entertainment and Yomiuri Telecasting Corporation. The series is based on Gosho Aoyama's Case Closed manga series. In Japan, the series is titled  but was changed due to legal issues with the title Detective Conan. The episodes' plot covers the arc where Conan Edogawa temporary returns as Jimmy Kudo.

The episodes use four pieces of theme music: two opening themes and two closing themes. The second opening theme is "Mysterious Eyes" by Garnet Crow and is used for the rest of the season. The first ending theme is "Free Magic" by WAG  until episode 179. The second ending theme is "Secret of My Heart" by Mai Kuraki.

The season initially ran from October 11, 1999 through June 5, 2000 on Nippon Television Network System in Japan. Episodes one to twenty-eight were later collected into nine DVD compilations by Shogakukan. They were released between March 25, 2001 and January 15, 2002 in Japan.


Episode list

Notes

 One hour long special episode.
 Two hour long special episode.

References
General

Specific

1999 Japanese television seasons
2000 Japanese television seasons
Season 7